Big Money or The Big Money may refer to:

Films 
Big Money (film), 1930
The Big Money (film), 1958

Literature 
Big Money (novel), by P. G. Wodehouse (1931)
Big Money, a novel by John Dos Passos, part of his U.S.A. trilogy

Music 
 "Big Money" (Game song), a 2011 song by Game from The R.E.D. Album
 "The Big Money", a 1985 song by Rush
 "Big Money", a 1994 song by Marc Ribot from Shrek
 "Big Money", a 1986 song by Big Black from Atomizer

Other uses 
Big Money!, a 2002 video game
Big Money: Chota Parda Bada Game, a 2008 Indian reality game show hosted by R. Madhavan